Difficult Loves is a 1970 short story collection by Italo Calvino. It concerns love and the difficulty of communication.

Some published versions of the English translation by William Weaver omit a number of the stories, and also include other Calvino stories about the Second World War and postwar period, including those from The Crow Comes Last; some of these were translated by Archibald Colquhoun and Peggy Wright. "The Argentine Ant" and "The Cloud of Smog" (as "Smog") do not appear in this book, but rather in the translated The Watcher and Other Stories. An English translation of "The Adventure of a Skier" was published by The New Yorker in their July 3, 2017 issue.

Stories
Starred stories are those also included in the incomplete versions of the English translation.

Difficult Loves
The Adventure of a Soldier*
The Adventure of a Bandit
The Adventure of a Bather*
The Adventure of a Clerk*
The Adventure of a Photographer*
The Adventure of a Traveler*
The Adventure of a Reader*
The Adventure of a Nearsighted Man*
The Adventure of a Wife
The Adventure of Two Spouses
The Adventure of a Poet*
The Adventure of a Skier
The Adventure of a Motorist

Difficult Life
The Argentine Ant
The Cloud of Smog

Adaptations
The "Adventure of Two Spouses" was loosely adapted into the "Renzo and Luciana" act of Boccaccio '70; the "Adventure of a Soldier" appears as one part of L'amore difficile, a film by Nino Manfredi.

Short story collections by Italo Calvino
1970 short story collections
Giulio Einaudi Editore books